Randy West (born Andrew Jay Abrams; October 12, 1947) is a retired American pornographic actor.

Early life and pre-porn career
West grew up in New York City and moved to South Florida in the late 1960s. He originally aspired to play professional baseball and attended the University of Miami on a baseball scholarship. He then changed directions and decided to pursue a career in music, performing in several unsuccessful rock bands over the next decade. West also worked as a nude art model during this period. He then moved to California in 1979 and became a Chippendales dancer, stripping for private events between 1980 and 1992.

Acting career
West's pornographic career began in 1978 with an appearance in the film Mystique while still living in Florida. In August 1980 he garnered attention when he became the first model to appear in the centerfold of Playgirl magazine with an erection. Later in his career he was cast as Robert Redford's body double in the 1993 Paramount Pictures film Indecent Proposal. He has performed with numerous porn actresses early on in their careers, including Seka, Jenna Jameson and Tera Patrick. In fact, West has been given credit for bringing future superstars Jameson and Patrick into the adult business. Additionally, he was the first male performer to work with future stars Victoria Paris and Ashlyn Gere.

West was a small-time drug dealer in the 1980s, supplying high-grade cannabis to his fellow performers. "Randy's a good guy... I used to buy pot from him. We used to go bowling," said former porn actor Tom Byron. Byron has said that West's pot was "my viagra in those days".

West's on-screen sexual performance has been referred to by observers a being like that of a "human pile driver". He has appeared as a performer in over 1,300 pornographic films, alongside an estimated 2,500 female co-stars.

West appeared in the 2012 documentary film After Porn Ends, in which his life since retiring as a porn performer is discussed.

Producer
West became involved in the more lucrative production side of the porn industry in 1993, as producer of adult films such as the Up and Cummers series which showcased new performers. With this and other series like I Love Lesbians, Real Female Masturbation and others, West's videos focused on "Real people having real sex – what a novel idea!" In one final video he stated that one of his greatest pleasures was watching his female partners have orgasms. Episodes had a fairly standard format: A short interview with the female performer to establish some background facts. Whether these were somewhat fictionalized or not, the chat established the young lady as an individual. Then came a succession of sex acts, each with the female performer an avid participant, including in almost every case, her orgasm. Randy filmed Jenna Jameson's first ever scenes for "Up and Cummers 10" & "11." All of West's productions are distributed by Evil Angel. He is the CEO of Randy West Productions.

Personal life
West's father and grandfather died from heart attacks. He  suffered a heart attack on June 2, 2009, while working out in the gym, and underwent emergency surgery to correct an occlusion in the anterior interventricular branch of his left coronary artery, commonly known as the widowmaker. He received a good prognosis for recovery.

West has never married or fathered children, which he blames on his career for making it hard for him to form "normal relationships." As of 2011, West was living in Las Vegas. He says he retired from the industry due to no longer wanting to live in Southern California, the base of the U.S. adult film sector. As of 2013, he spends his time competing in celebrity golf tournaments for charity.

Awards
 1993 – Lifetime Achievement Award from the Free Speech Coalition
 FOXE Award for Fan Favourite (Male) in '94, '95, '96 and '97
 XRCO 1994 – Best Pro-Am Series, Up and Cummers
 XRCO 1995 – Best Pro-Am Series, Up and Cummers
 AVN 1995 – Best Pro-Am Tape, Up and Cummers 7
 AVN 1997 – Best Pro-Am Tape, Up and Cummers 33
 AVN 1999 – Best Ethnic-Themed Series, Up and Cummers
 AVN 1999 – Best Pro-Am or Amateur Series, Up and Cummers
 AVN 2001 – Best Pro-Am or Amateur Series, Up and Cummers
 AVN 2002 – Best Pro-Am or Amateur Series, Up and Cummers
 AVN 2008 – Silverback of the Porn Industry, "He eats first"
 Listed at number 29 on the "List of Top 50 Porn Stars of All Time" by Adult Video News.
 Member of the AVN, FOXE and XRCO Halls of Fame
 Nominated in the AVN 'Best Actor' category 15 times

References

External links 

 
 
 
 
 The Official Randy West MySpace

1947 births
American film producers
American pornographic film producers
American male pornographic film actors
Living people
Pornographic film actors from Florida
Pornographic film actors from New York (state)